"Trust No 1" is the sixth episode of the ninth season of the American science fiction television series The X-Files. The episode was written by series creator Chris Carter and executive producer Frank Spotnitz, and directed by Tony Wharmby. "Trust No 1" helps to explore the series' overarching mythology. The episode received a Nielsen household rating of 5.1 and was viewed by 8.4 million viewers; it garnered mixed to negative reviews from television critics, with many feeling that it portrayed the series' characters in a way that was unfaithful to the show's history.

The show centers on FBI special agents who work on cases linked to the paranormal, called X-Files; this season focuses on the investigations of John Doggett (Robert Patrick), Monica Reyes (Annabeth Gish), and Dana Scully (Gillian Anderson). In this episode, Scully is hopeful about reuniting with her former partner, Fox Mulder (David Duchovny) when a complete stranger offers new information about what drove him into hiding. Yet her trust in the stranger may place Mulder in even more danger, for the man turns out to be a super soldier.

"Trust No 1" features former leading star Duchovny via the use of previously filmed footage. It was written in response to fans who felt that, during season eight, Mulder's abduction was not dealt with until his miraculous return in "This is Not Happening"/"Deadalive". Actor Terry O'Quinn, who appears in this episode as the Shadow Man, had appeared as different characters in the second season episode "Aubrey" and the 1998 feature film and appeared as Peter Watts in The X-Files sister show Millennium. The tagline for the episode is "They're Watching."

Plot
While at a coffee shop, Dana Scully (Gillian Anderson) sees an infant crying and sees its mother, Patti, arguing with her husband outside. Scully asks the mother if she is okay, and the mother leaves with her child. Meanwhile, John Doggett (Robert Patrick) and Monica Reyes (Annabeth Gish) visit Scully at Quantico to tell her about a tipster who wants to contact Fox Mulder (David Duchovny). Doggett encourages Scully to contact Mulder, believing the tipster has the names of the Super Soldiers and could prove vital to tracking them down. The tipster indicates that he is willing to share this information with no one other than Mulder. Scully, fearful for Mulder's safety, falsely claims not to know his whereabouts.

A short time later, Scully sees Patti having another argument with her husband, who drives off with their baby in the car. Scully approaches Patti, offering her assistance. Scully convinces Patti to stay over that night in her apartment after learning she has nowhere else to go. Meanwhile, Doggett and Reyes stake out the location where he traced the tipster's call. They see Patti's husband, who they believe to be the tipster, walk inside an apparently abandoned building. Inside, the husband sits at a computer. The Shadow Man (Terry O'Quinn), who appears to be the husband's boss, monitors Scully through surveillance.

The next morning, Patti shuts off the baby monitor and removes William from his crib. Scully awakens when she gets a phone call from Doggett warning her that the tipster they were following had just gone into her apartment building. Scully then hears William cry and confronts Patti at gunpoint. Just then, Patti's husband attempts to pick Scully's lock, but is stopped by Doggett and Reyes. The husband informs the agents that they are being watched, and signals to Scully to close the window. He then reveals to Scully that he is an NSA employee with no name. Patti says their daughter is just like William, and they only want to keep both children safe. The husband reveals that his supervisor has discovered the “Super Soldier” project and alludes to crimes against innocent people. He begs Scully to call Mulder out of hiding in order to give him this information.

Moments later, the Shadow Man calls Scully and tells her that she contact get Mulder in one day or else he will disappear with the Super Soldiers' identities. Scully refuses unless she can meet with the Shadow Man face-to-face. The Shadow Man gives Scully detailed instructions about how and where to meet him, warning her that even a slight deviation from his instructions would mean that he will never contact her again. The Shadow Man tells Scully to drive west in a series of vehicles until she is told to stop. He also tells her to change into a different outfit that he has in the trunk of the car she is driving; Scully reluctantly complies. The Shadow Man then comes face-to-face with Scully and destroys her vehicle with a remotely detonated bomb. He explains that he has been watching her for quite some time, and that, in addition to her clothing size, he knows everything about her, including "that one lonely night you invited Mulder to your bed."

Scully finally gives in and contacts Mulder; she tells Doggett that before Mulder left, they had worked out a plan that, if he was to return, he would be arriving by train. Doggett urges Scully to contact Mulder and tell him not to come, fearing that the Shadow Man is setting a trap for him. Scully replies that she wants to see Mulder, and that it is too late to call it off. Reyes, Doggett, and the NSA agent cover Scully at the train station. However, as the train pulls up, the Shadow Man appears and guns down the agent before approaching Scully. Before the Shadow Man can kill Scully, Doggett appears and shoots him twice, sending him falling onto the train tracks, where the train seemingly runs over him. Because there has been a shooting, much to Scully's dismay, a train employee radios to the conductor to keep the train moving and not to stop at that station.

While Scully consoles Patti, whose husband just died in Scully's arms, Doggett reports that he cannot find the Shadow Man's body. Scully, fearful that he is a Super Soldier pursuing Mulder, chases after the train with Doggett and Reyes. An employee who works for the train gets a call on his radio, saying that someone jumped off a train and into a rock quarry. Doggett and Reyes chase after someone they believe to be Mulder, while Scully goes deeper into the quarry. There, she is attacked by the Shadow Man. Suddenly, the Shadow Man is destroyed by the magnetite being mined from the quarry.

Production

"Trust No 1" was written by series creator Chris Carter along with executive producer Frank Spotnitz; it was directed by Tony Wharmby. The episode features former leading star David Duchovny via the use of previously shot footage. According to Matt Hurwitz and Chris Knowles in their book The Complete X-Files, the episode includes themes "about Orwellian surveillance." "Trust No 1" was written in response to fans who felt that, during season eight, Mulder's abduction was not dealt with until his miraculous return in "This is Not Happening"/"DeadAlive". Despite this, series director Kim Manners was critical of this take on Mulder, noting, "The only thing I thought we didn't do right during seasons eight and nine was that a lot of the shows were about Mulder, and I thought it was a mistake to make a series about a man that wasn't standing in front of the camera."

The email addresses that Mulder and Scully use to communicate with each other were real addresses, created and maintained by Ten Thirteen Productions. The tagline for the episode is "They're Watching", changed from the usual "The Truth is Out There".

Actor Terry O'Quinn, who appears in this episode as the Shadow Man, had appeared as different characters in the second season episode "Aubrey" and the 1998 feature film. He had also played a recurring role as Peter Watts on Millennium and appeared in the short-lived series Harsh Realm. O'Quinn later earned the nickname "Mr. Ten Thirteen", due to his appearance in multiple shows and movies affiliated with Ten Thirteen Productions, the company that produced The X-Files.

Broadcast and reception 
"Trust No 1" first premiered on the Fox network in the United States on January 6, 2002. The episode earned a Nielsen household rating of 5.1, meaning that it was seen by 5.1% of the nation's estimated households and was viewed by 5.4 million households, and 8.4 million viewers. It was the 55th most watched episode of television that aired during the week ending March 3. The episode eventually aired in the United Kingdom on BBC Two on December 8, 2002. The episode was later included on The X-Files Mythology, Volume 4 – Super Soldiers, a DVD collection that contains episodes involved with the alien super soldiers arc.

The episode received mixed to negative reviews from television critics. Jessica Morgan from Television Without Pity gave the episode a B− grade. Robert Shearman and Lars Pearson, in their book Wanting to Believe: A Critical Guide to The X-Files, Millennium & The Lone Gunmen, rated the episode one star out of five. The two called the entry "an exercise in futility […] at best" and argued that, because Duchovny had left the series, the sense of excitement that he might have made an appearance in the episode was completely gone. Furthermore, Shearman and Pearson heavily criticized Mulder and Scully's characterization, calling Mulder a character the audience "can't recognize any more" and Scully a "gullible patsy". M.A. Crang, in his book Denying the Truth: Revisiting The X-Files after 9/11, was also critical of the script's treatment of the characters, arguing that Mulder and Scully in this episode "sound nothing like the characters we have come to know". He also lamented that the episode did not examine the central theme of electronic surveillance in greater detail. Tom Kessenich, in his book Examinations, wrote a largely negative review of the episode. He derided the series for making it appear that Mulder abandoned the woman he loved and his own child. He noted, "Just because it walks, talks, and sometimes acts like The X-Files, doesn't make it The X-Files."

Notes

Footnotes

Bibliography

External links

"Trust No 1" on The X-Files official website
 

2002 American television episodes
Television episodes written by Chris Carter
Television episodes set in Maryland
The X-Files (season 9) episodes
Television episodes set in Virginia